St Paul's Church, Salisbury, England, is located on the north-west side of the city, next to St Paul's Roundabout and a short walk from the city centre and Salisbury train station. It is an Anglican church.

History 

In 1850 the vestry of St Clement's Church, which had served the area and was moved, it is believed, by Dr. W. C. Finch, met to consider for the first time the erection of a new church to house the expanding population. In pursuance of the decision taken then or soon after, the foundations of St. Paul's church in Devizes Road were laid in 1851, and in 1853 that building was consecrated. St. Clement's was demolished in 1852, but the churchyard has remained an open space.

St. Paul's, built in early 'Decorated' style to the design of T. H. Wyatt of London, consisted originally of chancel, nave of six bays, south aisle, west gallery, south vestry, small organ chamber, south porch and tower. The tower buttresses, some of the interior arches and piers, the font and various monuments were all salvaged from the demolished church of St. Clement's, and the new tower was built to the dimensions of the old to accommodate the bell-frame timbers and the six bells from the old church. Sidney Herbert and Bishop Denison contributed to the expenses of the new building.

In 1876 a north aisle and west porch were added. In 1880 the chancel walls were coloured, and in 1883 painted texts were placed over all the arches. In 1885 the chancel was retiled and carved fronts added to the choir stalls. In 1892 a new organ chamber for a new organ was constructed north of the chancel. In 1895 a screen was erected so as to convert the former organ chamber into a choir vestry. At the same time the choir stalls were rearranged, so that the choir could thereafter sit on either side of the chancel. There was a restoration with various alterations in 1898 and a restoration of the chancel in 1910. In 1917 a new choir vestry was constructed at the north-west corner of the church.

The parish registers from 1654 (christenings and marriages) and 1653 (burials), other than those in current use, are held in the Wiltshire and Swindon Record Office.

Clergy 
Craig Ryalls, Rector

References 

St Paul's Church website  Accessed March 2009
Wiltshire community history  Accessed March 2009

External links 
 

Salisbury, Saint Paul
Paul